DVD-Ds, also referred to as disposable DVDs, were a type of disposable digital versatile disc/digital video disc that were designed to be used for a maximum 48 hours after the containing package is opened. After this time, the DVDs became unreadable to DVD players because they contained a chemical that, after the set period of time, will prevent the underlying data from being read by DVD drives. The medium in itself was copy protection neutral and did not require additional Digital Rights Management types of applications to be installed for the content to be accessible.

See also
 DIVX and Flexplay, two other disposable disc formats
 Disc rot, the unintended decay of optical discs due to physical or chemical deterioration
 Planned obsolescence

References

External links
 dvd-d.com, archive copy from 2003
 DVD-D.org, archive copy from 2005
Die DVD-D
 Test du DVD-D : le DVD Jetable | Bhmag

DVD
Audiovisual ephemera